This is a list of women's amateur Swedish swimming champions.  The Swedish Swimming Championships (Swedish: Svenska Mästerskapen i simning, SM i simning, Sim-SM, Langbane-SM) are held annually in the Swedish summer in an outdoor  pool. The national championships are also trials for the Summer Olympics, World Championships and European Championships.  Records go back to 1899 in freestyle, backstroke, breaststroke, butterfly, and various relays and IM competitions. This list was compiled from Historiska simtag: Svensk simidrott under hundra ar, Solna: Svenska Simförbundet.

Current program

50 m freestyle

 1983 – Agneta Eriksson, Västerås SS
 1984 – Stina Persson, Kristianstads SLS
 1985 – Agneta Eriksson, Västerås SS
 1986 – Agneta Eriksson, Västerås SS
 1987 – Karin Furuhed, Borlänge SS
 1988 – Karin Furuhed, Borlänge SS
 1989 – Helena Åberg, Helsingborgs SS
 1990 – Helena Åberg, Helsingborgs SS
 1991 – Ellenor Svensson, Linköpings ASS
 1992 – Linda Olofsson, Sundsvalls SS
 1993 – Linda Olofsson, Sundsvalls SS
 1994 – Linda Olofsson, Sundsvalls SS
 1995 – Linda Olofsson, Södertälje SS
 1996 – Linda Olofsson, Södertälje SS
 1997 – Therese Alshammar, SK Neptun
 1998 – Therese Alshammar, SK Neptun
 1999 – Therese Alshammar, SK Neptun
 2000 – Therese Alshammar, SK Neptun
 2001 – Johanna Sjöberg, Södertälje SS
 2002 – Therese Alshammar, SK Neptun
 2003 – Therese Alshammar, SK Neptun
 2004 – Anna-Karin Kammerling, Sundsvalls SS
 2005 – Therese Alshammar, SK Neptun
 2006 – Therese Alshammar, SK Neptun
 2007 – Therese Alshammar, SK Neptun

100 m freestyle

 1910 – Greta Johansson, Stockholms KK
 1911 – Greta Johansson, Stockholms KK
 1912 – Greta Karlsson, Eskilstuna SS
 1913 – Emmy Machnow, Malmö SS
 1914 – Vera Thulin, Stockholms KK
 1915 – Emmy Machnow, Malmö SS
 1916 – Emmy Machnow, Malmö SS
 1917 – Emmy Machnow, Malmö SS
 1918 – Jane Gylling, SK Najaden
 1919 – Jane Gylling, SK Najaden
 1920 – Carin Nilsson, Stockholms KK
 1921 – Aina Berg, SK Najaden
 1922 – Aina Berg, SK Najaden
 1923 – Hjördis Töpel, SK Najaden
 1924 – Hjördis Töpel, SK Najaden
 1925 – Aina Berg, SK Najaden
 1926 – Aina Berg, SK Najaden
 1927 – Gurli Everlund, Malmö SS
 1928 – Gurli Everlund, Malmö SS
 1929 – Maj Eliasson, IFK Stockholm
 1930 – Hjördis Töpel, SK Najaden
 1931 – May Eliasson, IFK Stockholm
 1932 – May Eliasson, IFK Stockholm
 1933 – Ingrid Stenmarck, Malmö SS
 1934 – Ingrid Stenmarck, Malmö SS
 1935 – Ingrid Stenmarck, Malmö SS
 1936 – Ingrid Stenmarck, Malmö SS
 1937 – Ingrid Stenmarck, Malmö SS
 1938 – Ann-Marie Herlin, Stockholms KK
 1939 – Gunnel Söderberg, IFK Stockholm
 1940 – Gunnel Söderberg, IFK Stockholm
 1941 – Gunnel Söderberg, IFK Stockholm
 1942 – Gunnel Söderberg, IFK Stockholm
 1943 – Ingrid Thafvelin, Eskilstuna SS
 1944 – Gunvor Nilsson, Hälsingborgs SS
 1945 – Ingegärd Fredin, Ängby SS
 1946 – Ingegärd Fredin, Ängby SS
 1947 – Ingegärd Fredin, Ängby SS
 1948 – Ingegärd Fredin, Ängby SS
 1949 – Ingegärd Fredin, Ängby SS
 1950 – Marianne Lundquist, Karlskoga SS
 1951 – Marianne Lundquist, Karlskoga SS
 1952 – Marianne Lundquist, SK Neptun
 1953 – Marianne Lundquist, SK Neptun
 1954 – Marianne Lundquist, SK Neptun
 1955 – Anita Hellström, SK Neptun
 1956 – Kate Jobson, Varbergs GIF
 1957 – Kate Jobson, Varbergs GIF
 1958 – Kate Jobson, Varbergs GIF
 1959 – Kate Jobson, Varbergs GIF
 1960 – Karin Larsson, SK Ran
 1961 – Karin Grubb, SK Poseidon
 1962 – Ann-Christine Hagberg, SK Neptun
 1963 – Ann-Christine Hagberg, SK Neptun
 1964 – Ann-Charlott Lilja, SK Najaden
 1965 – Ann-Christine Hagberg, SK Neptun
 1966 – Ann-Christine Hagberg, SK Neptun
 1967 – Elisabeth Berglund, Timrå AIF
 1968 – Lotten Andersson, Linköpings ASS
 1969 – Vera Kock, Timrå AIF
 1970 – Elisabeth Berglund, Sundsvalls SS
 1971 – Anita Zarnowiecki, Simavdelningen 1902
 1972 – Anita Zarnowiecki, Simavdelningen 1902
 1973 – Diana Olsson, Stockholmspolisens IF
 1974 – Diana Olsson, Stockholmspolisens IF
 1975 – Ylva Persson, Borlänge SS
 1976 – Ylva Persson, Borlänge SS
 1977 – Birgitta Jönsson, Avesta SS
 1978 – Birgitta Jönsson, Avesta SS
 1979 – Agneta Eriksson, Västerås SS
 1980 – Carina Ljungdahl, Filipstads SS
 1981 – Agneta Eriksson, Västerås SS
 1982 – Agneta Eriksson, Västerås SS
 1983 – Agneta Eriksson, Västerås SS
 1984 – Maria Kardum, Kristianstads SLS
 1985 – Karin Furuhed, Borlänge SS
 1986 – Eva Nyberg, Mariestads SS
 1987 – Karin Furuhed, Borlänge SS
 1988 – Eva Nyberg, Mariestads SS
 1989 – Eva Nyberg, Mariestads SS
 1990 – Malin Gustafsson, Kristianstads SLS
 1991 – Eva Nyberg, Mariestads SS
 1992 – Ellenor Svensson, Norrköpings KK
 1993 – Louise Jöhncke, Spårvägens SF
 1994 – Louise Jöhncke, Spårvägens SF
 1995 – Ellenor Svensson, Norrköpings KK
 1996 – Linda Olofsson, Södertälje SS
 1997 – Therese Alshammar, SK Neptun
 1998 – Therese Alshammar, SK Neptun
 1999 – Louise Jöhncke, Spårvägens SF
 2000 – Malin Svahnström, Väsby SS
 2001 – Johanna Sjöberg, Södertälje SS
 2002 – Therese Alshammar, SK Neptun
 2003 – Johanna Sjöberg, Spårvägens SF
 2004 – Johanna Sjöberg, Spårvägens SF
 2005 – Josefin Lillhage, Väsby SS
 2006 – Johanna Sjöberg, Spårvägens SF
 2007 – Josefin Lillhage, Väsby SS

200 m freestyle

 1970 – Anita Zarnowiecki, Simavdelningen 1902
 1971 – Irwi Johansson, SK Najaden
 1972 – Irwi Johansson, SK Najaden
 1973 – Irwi Johansson, SK Najaden
 1974 – Gunilla Lundberg, Umeå SS
 1975 – Eva Andersson, SK Najaden
 1976 – Pia Martesson, Varbergs GIF
 1977 – Birgitta Jönsson, Avesta SS
 1978 – Birgitta Jönsson, Avesta SS
 1979 – Monica Parsmark, Upsala SS
 1980 – Tina Gustavsson, Norrköpings KK
 1981 – Tina Gustavsson, Norrköpings KK
 1982 – Agneta Eriksson, Västerås SS
 1983 – Susanne Nilsson, Filipstads SS
 1984 – Ann Linder, SK Najaden
 1985 – Agneta Eriksson, Västerås SS
 1986 – Eva Nyberg, Mariestads SS
 1987 – Agneta Eriksson, Västerås SS
 1988 – Susanne Nilsson, Filipstads SS
 1989 – Eva Nyberg, Mariestads SS
 1990 – Malin Gustafsson, Kristianstads SLS
 1991 – Eva Nyberg, Mariestads SS
 1992 – Malin Nilsson, Malmö KK
 1993 – Malin Nilsson, Malmö KK
 1994 – Malin Nilsson, Malmö KK
 1995 – Louise Jöhnke, Spårvägens SF
 1996 – Louise Jöhnke, Spårvägens SF
 1997 – Johanna Sjöberg, Helsingborgs SS
 1998 – Ida Mattsson, SK Triton
 1999 – Ida Mattsson, SK Triton
 2000 – Jenny Redlund, Malmö KK
 2001 – Josefin Lillhage, Väsby SS
 2002 – Josefin Lillhage, Väsby SS
 2003 – Josefin Lillhage, Väsby SS
 2004 – Josefin Lillhage, Väsby SS
 2005 – Josefin Lillhage, Väsby SS
 2006 – Josefin Lillhage, Väsby SS
 2007 – Josefin Lillhage, Väsby SS

400 m freestyle

 1933 – Ingrid Bredelius, SK Najaden
 1934 – Ingrid Bredelius, SK Najaden
 1935 – Margot Lundberg, Jönköpings SLS
 1936 – Sally Bauer, Stockholms KK
 1937 – Vivi Strandberg, Alingsås SS
 1938 – Maili Andersson, IFK Stockholm
 1939 – Gunnel Söderberg, IFK Stockholm
 1940 – Ingrid Thafvelin, Eskilstuna SS
 1941 – Ingrid Thafvelin, Eskilstuna SS
 1942 – Ingrid Thafvelin, Eskilstuna SS
 1943 – Ingrid Thafvelin, Eskilstuna SS
 1944 – Ingrid Thafvelin, Eskilstuna SS
 1945 – Ellen Larsson, Harnäs SS
 1946 – Ellen Larsson, Harnäs SS
 1947 – Gesila Thidholm, Trelleborgs SS
 1948 – Gesila Thidholm, Trelleborgs SS
 1949 – Gesila Thidholm, Trelleborgs SS
 1950 – Gesila Thidholm, Trelleborgs SS
 1951 – Marianne Lundqvist, Karlskoga SS
 1952 – Ingegärd Fredin, SK Neptun
 1953 – Marianne Lundqvist, SK Neptun
 1954 – Anita Hellström, SK Neptun
 1955 – Anita Hellström, SK Neptun
 1956 – Karin Larsson, SK Ran
 1957 – Karin Larsson, SK Ran
 1958 – Karin Larsson, SK Ran
 1959 – Bibbi Segerström, SK Neptun
 1960 – Jane Cederqvist, SK Neptun
 1961 – Jane Cederqvist, SK Neptun
 1962 – Elisabeth Ljunggren, SK Neptun
 1963 – Elisabeth Ljunggren, SK Neptun
 1964 – Elisabeth Ljunggren, SK Neptun
 1965 – Ann-Charlotte Lilja, SK Najaden
 1966 – Ann-Charlotte Lilja, SK Najaden
 1967 – Elisabeth Ljunggren, SK Neptun
 1968 – Elisabeth Berglund, Timrå AIF
 1969 – Gunilla Jonsson, Malmö SS
 1970 – Gunilla Jonsson, Malmö SS
 1971 – Gunilla Jonsson, Malmö SS
 1972 – Irwi Johansson, SK Najaden
 1973 – Irwi Johansson, SK Najaden
 1974 – Marie Sundeborn, Värnamo SS
 1975 – Pia Mårtensson, Varbergs GIF
 1976 – Ingrid Nilsson, Helsingborgs SS
 1977 – Susanne Ackum, Borlänge SS
 1978 – Susanne Ackum, Borlänge SS
 1979 – Monica Parsmark, Upsala SS
 1980 – Monica Parsmark, Upsala SS
 1981 – Ann Linder, SK Najaden
 1982 – Suzanne Nilsson, Filipstads SS
 1983 – Suzanne Nilsson, Filipstads SS
 1984 – Ann Linder, SK Najaden
 1985 – Christina Erlén, Växjö SS
 1986 – Anette Möller, Varbergs Sim
 1987 – Eva Nyberg, Mariestads SS
 1988 – Linda Rönnbäck, Luleå SS
 1989 – Eva Nyberg, Mariestads SS
 1990 – Malin Gustafsson, Kristianstads SLS
 1991 – Eva Nyberg, Mariestads SS
 1992 – Malin Nilsson, Malmö KK
 1993 – Malin Nilsson, Malmö KK
 1994 – Malin Nilsson, Malmö KK
 1995 – Malin Nilsson, Simavdelningen 1902
 1996 – Malin Nilsson, Simavdelningen 1902
 1997 – Åsa Sandlund, Linköpings ASS
 1998 – Ida Mattsson, SK Triton
 1999 – Lotta Wänberg, Malmö KK
 2000 – Åsa Sandlund, Linköpings ASS
 2001 – Ann Berglund, Jönköpings SS
 2002 – Ida Mattsson, Trelleborgs SS
 2003 – Josefin Lillhage, Väsby SS
 2004 – Josefin Lillhage, Väsby SS
 2005 – Josefin Lillhage, Väsby SS
 2006 – Josefin Lillhage, Väsby SS
 2007 – Gabriella Fagundez, SK Ran

800 m freestyle

 1970 – Gunilla Jonsson, Malmö SS
 1971 – Gunilla Jonsson, Malmö SS
 1972 – Else Gunsten, Kristianstads SLS
 1973 – Else Gunsten, Kristianstads SLS
 1974 – Else Gunsten, Kristianstads SLS
 1975 – Pia Ottosson, Mariestads SS
 1976 – Ingrid Nilsson, Helsingborgs SS
 1977 – Kicki Pettersson, Linköpings ASS
 1978 – Susanne Ackum, Borlänge SS
 1979 – Susanne Ackum, Borlänge SS
 1980 – Annika Lindholm, Linköpings ASS
 1981 – Ann Linder, SK Najaden
 1982 – Ann Linder, SK Najaden
 1983 – Ulrika Sandmark, Spårvägens GoIF
 1984 – Ann Linder, SK Najaden
 1985 – Christina Erlén, Växjö SS
 1986 – Anette Möller, Varbergs Sim
 1987 – Christina Erlén, Växjö SS
 1988 – Linda Rönnback, Luleå SS
 1989 – Åsa Blom, Motala SS
 1990 – Malin Nilsson, Malmö KK
 1991 – Andrea Bolin, Växjö SS
 1992 – Malin Nilsson, Malmö KK
 1993 – Malin Nilsson, Malmö KK
 1994 – Malin Nilsson, Malmö KK
 1995 – Malin Nilsson, Simavdelningen 1902
 1996 – Malin Nilsson, Simavdelningen 1902
 1997 – Åsa Sandlund, Linköpings ASS
 1998 – Camilla Helgesson, Malmö KK
 1999 – Åsa Sandlund, Linköpings ASS
 2000 – Åsa Sandlund, Linköpings ASS
 2001 – Åsa Sandlund, Linköpings ASS
 2002 – Åsa Sandlund, Linköpings ASS
 2003 – Åsa Sandlund, Linköpings ASS
 2004 – Teresia Gimholt, S77 Stenungsund
 2005 – Teresia Gimholt, S77 Stenungsund
 2006 – Eva Berglund, Jönköpings SS
 2007 – Gabriella Fagundez, SK Ran

1500 m freestyle

 1983 – Ulrika Sandmark, Spårvägens GoIF
 1984 – Ann Linder, SK Najaden
 1985 – Ulrika Sandmark, Spårvägens GoIF
 2001 – Åsa Sandlund, Linköpings ASS
 2002 – Åsa Sandlund, Linköpings ASS
 2003 – Åsa Sandlund, Linköpings ASS
 2004 – Teresia Gimholt, S77 Stenungsund
 2005 – Teresia Gimholt, S77 Stenungsund
 2006 – Eva Berglund, Jönköpings SS
 2007 – Gabriella Fagundez, SK Ran

50 m backstroke

 1994 – Therese Alshammar, SK Neptun
 1995 – Therese Alshammar, SK Neptun
 1996 – Therese Alshammar, SK Neptun
 1998 – Therese Alshammar, SK Neptun
 1999 – Therese Alshammar, SK Neptun
 2000 – Therese Alshammar, SK Neptun
 2001 – Camilla Johansson, Trelleborgs SS
 2002 – Therese Alshammar, SK Neptun
 2003 – Susannah Moonan, Södertörns SS
 2004 – Susannah Moonan, Södertörns SS
 2005 – Therese Alshammar, SK Neptun
 2006 – Therese Alshammar, SK Neptun
 2007 – Elin Harnebrandt, Göteborg Sim

100 m backstroke

 1928 – Gurli Everlund, Malmö SS
 1929 – Astrid Carlsson, Nässjö SLS
 1930 – Astrid Carlsson, Nässjö SLS
 1931 – Ingrid Dott, Norrköpings KK
 1932 – Astrid Carlsson, Nässjö SLS
 1933 – Kerstin Isberg, IFK Stockholm
 1934 – Astrid Carlsson, Nässjö SLS
 1935 – Margot Lundberg, Jönköpings SLS
 1936 – Margot Lundberg, Jönköpings SLS
 1937 – Hjalmi Bornström, Västerås SS
 1938 – Ann-Marie Herrlin, Stockholms KK
 1939 – Kerstin Nilsson, SK Najaden
 1940 – Elisabeth Boman, Linköpings ASS
 1941 – Ingrid Thafvelin, Eskilstuna SS
 1942 – Kerstin Åkerberg, IFK Stockholm
 1943 – Kjerstin Sörenson, Malmö SS
 1944 – Kerstin Åkerberg, IFK Stockholm
 1945 – Kerstin Åkerberg, IFK Stockholm
 1946 – Anne-May Asp, Trelleborgs SS
 1947 – Ingegärd Fredin, IFK Stockholm
 1948 – Ingegärd Fredin, IFK Stockholm
 1949 – Ingegärd Fredin, IFK Stockholm
 1950 – Ingegärd Fredin, IFK Stockholm
 1951 – Marianne Lundquist, Karlskoga SS
 1952 – Ingegärd Fredin, IFK Stockholm
 1953 – Margareta Westesson, SK Poseidon
 1954 – Birgitta Ljunggren, Norrköpings KK
 1955 – Margareta Westesson, SK Poseidon
 1956 – Margareta Westesson, SK Poseidon
 1957 – Gullbritt Jönsson, SK Poseidon
 1958 – Bibbi Segerström, SK Neptun
 1959 – Bibbi Segerström, SK Neptun
 1960 – Bibbi Segerström, SK Neptun
 1961 – Bibbi Segerström, SK Neptun
 1962 – Marianne Stridh, Malmö SS
 1963 – Birgitta Haagman, Upsala SS
 1964 – Birgitta Haagman, Upsala SS
 1965 – Birgitta Haagman, Upsala SS
 1966 – Yvonne Hiljebäck, Stockholmspolisens IF
 1967 – Yvonne Hiljebäck, Stockholmspolisens IF
 1968 – Yvonne Hiljebäck, Stockholmspolisens IF
 1969 – Eva Folkesson, Kristianstads SLS
 1970 – Eva Folkesson, Kristianstads SLS
 1971 – Eva Folkesson, Kristianstads SLS
 1972 – Anita Zarnowiecki, Simavdelningen 1902
 1973 – Diana Olsson, Stockholmspolisens IF
 1974 – Diana Olsson, Stockholmspolisens IF
 1975 – Gunilla Lundberg, Umeå SS
 1976 – Cecilia Eklund, Täby Sim
 1977 – Tina Gustavsson, Norrköpings KK
 1978 – Tina Gustavsson, Norrköpings KK
 1979 – Tina Gustavsson, Norrköpings KK
 1980 – Pensé Andersson, Landskrona SS
 1981 – Johanna Holmén, Västerås SS
 1982 – Eva Lundahl, Borlänge SS
 1983 – Anna-Karin Eriksson, Kalix SS
 1984 – Anna-Karin Eriksson, Kalix SS
 1985 – Anna-Karin Eriksson, Kalix SS
 1986 – Anna-Karin Eriksson, Kalix SS
 1987 – Johanna Larsson, Mariestads SS
 1988 – Camilla Olsson, Malmö KK
 1989 – Johanna Larsson, Mariestads SS
 1990 – Camilla Olsson, Malmö KK
 1991 – Anna-Karin Englund, Kalix SS
 1992 – Therese Alshammar, Järfälla SS
 1993 – Therese Alshammar, SK Neptun
 1994 – Therese Alshammar, SK Neptun
 1995 – Therese Alshammar, SK Neptun
 1996 – Therese Alshammar, SK Neptun
 1997 – Therese Alshammar, SK Neptun
 1998 – Therese Alshammar, SK Neptun
 1999 – Therese Alshammar, SK Neptun
 2000 – Nelly Jörgensen, Helsingborgs SS
 2001 – Camilla Johansson, Trelleborgs SS
 2002 – Susannah Moonan, Södertörns SS
 2003 – Susannah Moonan, Södertörns SS
 2004 – Carin Möller, Kalmar SS
 2005 – Therese Svendsen, SK Ran
 2006 – Therese Svendsen, SK Ran
 2007 – Carin Möller, Spårvägens SF

200 m backstroke

 1965 – Lena Bengtsson, SK Neptun
 1966 – Lena Bengtsson, SK Neptun
 1967 – Britt-Marie Hammarsten, Robertsfors SS
 1968 – Yvonne Hiljebäck, Stockholmspolisens IF
 1969 – Eva Folkesson, Kristianstads SLS
 1970 – Eva Folkesson, Kristianstads SLS
 1971 – Anita Zarnowiecki, Simavdelningen 1902
 1972 – Anita Zarnowiecki, Simavdelningen 1902
 1973 – Diana Olsson, Stockholmspolisens IF
 1974 – Diana Olsson, Stockholmspolisens IF
 1975 – Gunilla Lundberg, Umeå SS
 1976 – Tina Gustavsson, Norrköpings KK
 1977 – Tina Gustavsson, Norrköpings KK
 1978 – Tina Gustavsson, Norrköpings KK
 1979 – Tina Gustavsson, Norrköpings KK
 1980 – Pensé Andersson, Landskrona SS
 1981 – Johanna Holmén, Västerås SS
 1982 – Johanna Holmén, Västerås SS
 1983 – Sofia Kraft, Götene SS
 1984 – Sofia Kraft, Götene SS
 1985 – Anna-Karin Eriksson, Kalix SS
 1986 – Anna-Karin Eriksson, Kalix SS
 1987 – Johanna Larsson, Mariestads SS
 1988 – Camilla Olsson, Malmö KK
 1989 – Johanna Larsson, Mariestads SS
 1990 – Camilla Olsson, Malmö KK
 1991 – Camilla Olsson, Malmö KK
 1992 – Magdalea Schultz, Malmö KK
 1993 – Camilla Johansson, Växjö SS
 1994 – Camilla Johansson, Växjö SS
 1995 – Annika Rasmusson, Malmö KK
 1996 – Camilla Johansson, Växjö SS
 1997 – Camilla Johansson, Växjö SS
 1998 – Therese Alshammar, SK Neptun
 1999 – Camilla Johansson, Växjö SS
 2000 – Sofia Svensson, SK Poseidon
 2001 – Camilla Johansson, Trelleborgs SS
 2002 – Carin Möller, Kalmar SS
 2003 – Martina Svensson, Linköpings ASS
 2004 – Erika Hegestig, Jönköpings SS
 2005 – Therese Svendsen, SK Ran
 2006 – Therese Svendsen, SK Ran
 2007 – Carin Möller, Spårvägens SF

50 m breaststroke

 1993 – Hanna Jaltner, Växjö SS
 1994 – Emma Igelström, Karlshamns SK
 1995 – Maria Östling, SS Mora
 1996 – Hanna Jaltner, Växjö SS
 1998 – Maria Östling, Södertörns SS
 1999 – Maria Östling, Södertörns SS
 2000 – Julia Russel, SK Neptun
 2001 – Maria Östling, Södertörns SS
 2002 – Emma Igelström, Spårvägens SF
 2003 – Emma Igelström, Spårvägens SF
 2004 – Maria Östling, Södertörns SS
 2005 – Rebecca Ejdervik, Täby Sim
 2006 – Rebecca Ejdervik, Täby Sim
 2007 – Hanna Eriksson, Södertälje SS

100 m breaststroke

 1948 – Anna-Lis Blomqvist, Jönköpings SLS
 1953 – Berit Mattsson, Örebro SS
 1961 – Barbro Eriksson, Nyköpings SS
 1962 – Christina Olsson, Limhamns SS
 1963 – Agneta Berg, Göteborgs KK
 1964 – Monika Israelsson, Karlskrona SS
 1965 – Monika Israelsson, Karlskrona SS
 1966 – Britt-Marie Lahti, Bodens BK
 1967 – Yvonne Brage, Skövde SS
 1968 – Yvonne Brage, Skövde SS
 1969 – Yvonne Brage, Skövde SS
 1970 – Yvonne Brage, Skövde SS
 1971 – Britt-Marie Smedh, Stockholmspolisens IF
 1972 – Britt-Marie Smedh, Stockholmspolisens IF
 1973 – Britt-Marie Smedh, Stockholmspolisens IF
 1974 – Jeanette Petersson, SK Najaden
 1975 – Jeanette Petersson, SK Najaden
 1976 – Eva-Marie Håkansson, Kristianstads SLS
 1977 – Eva-Marie Håkansson, Kristianstads SLS
 1978 – Eva-Marie Håkansson, Kristianstads SLS
 1979 – Ann-Sofi Roos, Kristianstads SLS
 1980 – Eva-Marie Håkansson, Kristianstads SLS
 1981 – Eva-Marie Håkansson, Kristianstads SLS
 1982 – Eva-Marie Håkansson, Kristianstads SLS
 1983 – Eva-Marie Håkansson, Kristianstads SLS
 1984 – Eva-Marie Håkansson, Kristianstads SLS
 1985 – Annelie Holmström, Stockholmspolisens IF
 1986 – Annelie Holmström, Stockholmspolisens IF
 1987 – Lisa Lönn, SS Mora
 1988 – Anna-Karin Persson, Kungälvs SS
 1989 – Anna-Karin Persson, Kungälvs SS
 1990 – Anna-Karin Persson, Kungälvs SS
 1991 – Charlotte Humling, Sandvikens SoHK
 1992 – Hanna Jaltner, Växjö SS
 1993 – Hanna Jaltner, Växjö SS
 1994 – Emma Igelström, Karlshamns SK
 1995 – Maria Östling, SS Mora
 1996 – Lena Eriksson, Spårvägens SF
 1997 – Hanna Jaltner, Växjö SS
 1998 – Hanna Jaltner, Växjö SS and Maria Östling, Södertörns SS
 1999 – Maria Östling, Södertörns SS
 2000 – Maria Östling, Södertörns SS
 2001 – Maria Östling, Södertörns SS
 2002 – Emma Igelström, Spårvägens SF
 2003 – Emma Igelström, Spårvägens SF
 2004 – Maria Östling, Södertörns SS
 2005 – Josefin Wede, SK Sydsim
 2006 – Rebecca Ejdervik, Täby Sim
 2007 – Joline Höglund, Göteborg Sim

200 m breaststroke

 1921 – Margit Bratt, Stockholms KK
 1922 – Wivan Pettersson, Eskilstuna SS
 1923 – Hjördes Töpel, SK Najaden
 1924 – Wivan Pettersson, Eskilstuna SS
 1925 – Wivan Pettersson, Eskilstuna SS
 1926 – Brita Hazelius, IFK Falun
 1927 – Marianne Gustafsson, Eskilstuna SS
 1928 – Brita Hazelius, IFK Falun
 1929 – Brita Hazelius, IFK Falun
 1930 – Brita Hazelius, IFK Falun
 1931 – Kerstin Isberg, IFK Stockholm
 1932 – Kerstin Isberg, IFK Stockholm
 1933 – Inga Jönnson, SK Ran
 1934 – Inga-Lill Hermansson, SK Najaden
 1935 – Maj-Britt Andersson, Limhamns SS
 1936 – Kerstin Isberg, IFK Stockholm
 1937 – Maj-Britt Andersson, Limhamns SS
 1938 – Maj-Britt Andersson, Limhamns SS
 1939 – Maj-Britt Andersson, Limhamns SS
 1940 – Inga-Lill Hermansson, SK Najaden
 1941 – Ingrid Wallin, IFK Stockholm
 1942 – Doris Ek, Örebro SS
 1943 – Maj-Britt Jansson, Limhamns SS
 1944 – Marianne Nilsson, Malmö SS
 1945 – Marianne Fernlund, Stockholms KK
 1946 – Marianne Fernlund, Stockholms KK
 1947 – Marianne Fernlund, Stockholms KK
 1948 – Marianne Fernlund, Stockholms KK
 1949 – Marianne Fernlund, Stockholms KK
 1950 – Beth Johansson, Karlstads SS
 1951 – Ulla-Britt Eklund, SK Neptun
 1952 – Ulla-Britt Eklund, SK Neptun
 1953 – Ruth Wester, SK Neptun
 1954 – Kerstin Pettersson, IF Elfsborg
 1955 – Marianne Pavoni, SK Neptun
 1956 – Gun-Britt Hellberg, Brännans IF
 1957 – Gun-Britt Hellberg, Brännans IF
 1958 – Marianne Johansson, SK Neptun
 1959 – Margareta Wingquist, SK Neptun
 1960 – Barbro Eriksson, Nyköpings SS
 1961 – Barbro Eriksson, Nyköpings SS
 1962 – Marianne Sjöström, Malmö SS
 1963 – Kristina Kallerhult, Nyköpings SS
 1964 – Monica Israelsson, Karlskrona SS
 1965 – Yvonne Brage, Skövde SS
 1966 – Yvonne Brage, Skövde SS
 1967 – Yvonne Brage, Skövde SS
 1968 – Yvonne Brage, Skövde SS
 1969 – Yvonne Brage, Skövde SS
 1970 – Yvonne Brage, Skövde SS
 1971 – Yvonne Brage, Skövde SS
 1972 – Britt-Marie Smedh, Stockholmspolisens IF
 1973 – Britt-Marie Smedh, Stockholmspolisens IF
 1974 – Britt-Marie Smedh, Stockholmspolisens IF
 1975 – Ann-Sofi Roos, Kristianstads SLS
 1976 – Ann-Sofi Roos, Kristianstads SLS
 1977 – Ingela Havaas, Skövde SS
 1978 – Ingela Havaas, Skövde SS
 1979 – Ann-Sofi Roos, Kristianstads SLS
 1980 – Ann-Sofi Roos, Kristianstads SLS
 1981 – Eva-Marie Håkansson, Kristianstads SLS
 1982 – Eva-Marie Håkansson, Kristianstads SLS
 1983 – Anneli Holmström, Stockholmspolisens IF
 1984 – Anneli Holmström, Stockholmspolisens IF
 1985 – Åsa Hedlund, Linköpings ASS
 1986 – Anna Rosengren, SS Mora
 1987 – Helena Kälvehed, SK Korrugal
 1988 – Anna-Karin Persson, Kungälvs SS
 1989 – Anna-Karin Persson, Kungälvs SS
 1990 – Anna-Karin Persson, Kungälvs SS
 1991 – Charlotte Humling, Sandvikens SoHK
 1992 – Anna-Karin Dahlström, Ängelholms SS
 1993 – Charlotte Humling, Södertälje SS
 1994 – Lena Eriksson, Spårvägens SF
 1995 – Maria Östling, SS Mora
 1996 – Lena Eriksson, Spårvägens SF
 1997 – Maria Östling, Södertörns SS
 1998 – Emma Igelström, Karlshamns SK
 1999 – Emma Igelström, Spårvägens SF
 2000 – Emma Igelström, Spårvägens SF
 2001 – Sara Larsson, Ludvika SS
 2002 – Emma Igelström, Spårvägens SF
 2003 – Emma Igelström, Spårvägens SF
 2004 – Sara Larsson, Ludvika SS
 2005 – Josefin Wede, SK Sydsim
 2006 – Sandra Jacobsson, Täby Sim
 2007 – Joline Höglund, Göteborg Sim

50 m butterfly

 1994 – Anna Lindberg, Helsingborgs SS
 1995 – Louise Karlsson, Skärets SS
 1996 – Johanna Sjöberg, Helsingborgs SS
 1998 – Anna-Karin Kammerling, Sundsvalls SS
 1999 – Anna-Karin Kammerling, Sundsvalls SS
 2000 – Therese Alshammar, SK Neptun
 2001 – Anna-Karin Kammerling, Sundsvalls SS
 2002 – Anna-Karin Kammerling, Sundsvalls SS
 2003 – Anna-Karin Kammerling, Sundsvalls SS
 2004 – Anna-Karin Kammerling, Sundsvalls SS
 2005 – Therese Alshammar, SK Neptun
 2006 – Therese Alshammar, SK Neptun
 2007 – Therese Alshammar, SK Neptun

100 m butterfly

 1949 – Ulla-Britt Eklund, SK Neptun
 1950 – Ulla-Britt Eklund, SK Neptun
 1951 – Ulla-Britt Eklund, SK Neptun
 1952 – Ulla-Britt Eklund, SK Neptun
 1954 – Ulla-Britt Eklund, SK Neptun
 1955 – Birgitta Lundqvist, SK Neptun
 1956 – Birgitta Lundqvist, SK Neptun
 1957 – Birgitta Lundqvist, SK Neptun
 1958 – Birgitta Lundqvist, SK Neptun
 1959 – Kristina Larsson, SK Ran
 1960 – Kristina Larsson, SK Ran
 1961 – Karin Stenbäck, SK Neptun
 1962 – Karin Stenbäck, SK Neptun
 1963 – Karin Stenbäck, SK Neptun
 1964 – Lotten Andersson, Timrå AIF
 1965 – Lotten Andersson, Linköpings ASS
 1966 – Ingrid Gustavsson, Luleå SS
 1967 – Ingrid Gustavsson, Luleå SS
 1968 – Lotten Andersson, Linköpings ASS
 1969 – Elisabeth Hjort, Gävle SS
 1970 – Eva Wikner, Stockholmspolisens IF
 1971 – Eva Wikner, Stockholmspolisens IF
 1972 – Eva Wikner, Stockholmspolisens IF
 1973 – Gunilla Andersson, SK Neptun
 1974 – Gunilla Andersson, SK Neptun
 1975 – Gunilla Andersson, SK Neptun
 1976 – Gunilla Andersson, SK Neptun
 1977 – Lena de Val, Linköpings ASS
 1978 – Agneta Mårtensson, Karlslunds IF
 1979 – Agneta Mårtensson, Karlslunds IF
 1980 – Agneta Mårtensson, Karlslunds IF
 1981 – Armi Airaksinen, Stockholmspolisens IF
 1982 – Agneta Eriksson, Västerås SS
 1983 – Agneta Eriksson, Västerås SS
 1984 – Agneta Eriksson, Västerås SS
 1985 – Agneta Eriksson, Västerås SS
 1986 – Agneta Eriksson, Västerås SS
 1987 – Agneta Eriksson, Västerås SS
 1988 – Annlo Edenholm, Södertörns SS
 1989 – Therèse Lundin, Simavdelningen 1902
 1990 – Anna Lindberg, Helsingborgs SS
 1991 – Therèse Lundin, Simavdelningen 1902
 1992 – Therèse Lundin, Simavdelningen 1902
 1993 – Therèse Lundin, Helsingborgs SS
 1994 – Louise Jöhncke, Spårvägens SF
 1995 – Johanna Sjöberg, Helsingborgs SS
 1996 – Johanna Sjöberg, Helsingborgs SS
 1997 – Johanna Sjöberg, Helsingborgs SS
 1998 – Anna-Karin Kammerling, Sundsvalls SS
 1999 – Johanna Sjöberg, Södertälje SS
 2000 – Sara Nordenstam, Väsby SS
 2001 – Johanna Sjöberg, Södertälje SS
 2002 – Anna-Karin Kammerling, Sundsvalls SS
 2003 – Anna-Karin Kammerling, Sundsvalls SS
 2004 – Anna-Karin Kammerling, Sundsvalls SS
 2005 – Johanna Sjöberg, Spårvägens SF
 2006 – Anna-Karin Kammerling, Sundsvalls SS
 2007 – Petra Granlund, Väsby SS

200 m butterfly

 1953 – Ulla-Britt Eklund, SK Neptun
 1970 – Eva Wikner, Stockholmspolisens IF
 1971 – Eva Wikner, Stockholmspolisens IF
 1972 – Eva Wikner, Stockholmspolisens IF
 1973 – Gunilla Andersson, SK Neptun
 1974 – Gunilla Andersson, SK Neptun
 1975 – Gunilla Andersson, SK Neptun
 1976 – Lena de Val, Linköpings ASS
 1977 – Lena de Val, Linköpings ASS
 1978 – Agneta Mårtensson, Karlslunds IF
 1979 – Agneta Mårtensson, Karlslunds IF
 1980 – Armi Airaksinen, Stockholmspolisens IF
 1981 – Agneta Mårtensson, Karlslunds IF
 1982 – Ann Carlsson, Skövde SS
 1983 – Annelie Wennberg, Spårvägens GoIF
 1984 – Ann Carlsson, Malmö KK
 1985 – Eva Jonasson, Ölands SK
 1986 – Annelie Wennberg, Spårvägens GoIF
 1987 – Annlo Edenholm, Södertörns SS
 1988 – Anette Philipsson, Linköpings ASS
 1989 – Therèse Lundin, Simavdelningen 1902
 1990 – Therèse Lundin, Simavdelningen 1902
 1991 – Malin Strömberg, Ystads SS
 1992 – Therèse Lundin, Simavdelningen 1902
 1993 – Malin Strömberg, Ystads SS
 1994 – Mikaela Laurén, Södertälje SS
 1995 – Mikaela Laurén, SK Neptun
 1996 – Mikaela Laurén, SK Neptun
 1997 – Johanna Sjöberg, Helsingborgs SS
 1998 – Sara Nordenstam, Skärets SS
 1999 – Sara Nordenstam, Skärets SS
 2000 – Destiny Laurén, SK Neptun
 2001 – Sara Nordenstam, Väsby SS
 2002 – Sara Nordenstam, Väsby SS
 2003 – Mia Brodén, Falu SS
 2004 – Petra Granlund, S77 Stenungsund
 2005 – Petra Granlund, S77 Stenungsund
 2006 – Petra Granlund, S77 Stenungsund
 2007 – Petra Granlund, Väsby SS

200 m individual medley

 1965 – Britt Julander, Gävle SS
 1966 – Lotten Andersson, Linköpings ASS
 1967 – Ingrid Gustavsson, Luleå SS
 1968 – Yvonne Brage, Skövde SS
 1969 – Anita Zarnowiecki, Simavdelningen 1902
 1970 – Anita Zarnowiecki, Simavdelningen 1902
 1971 – Anita Zarnowiecki, Simavdelningen 1902
 1972 – Anita Zarnowiecki, Simavdelningen 1902
 1973 – Diana Olsson, Stockholmspolisens IF
 1974 – Diana Olsson, Stockholmspolisens IF
 1975 – Anita Zarnowiecki, Simavdelningen 1902
 1976 – Diana Olsson, Stockholmspolisens IF
 1977 – Monika Parsmark, Hudiksvalls SS
 1978 – Ann-Sofi Roos, Kristianstads SLS
 1979 – Ann-Sofi Roos, Kristianstads SLS
 1980 – Ann-Sofi Roos, Kristianstads SLS
 1981 – Anette Philipsson, Linköpings ASS
 1982 – Anette Philipsson, Linköpings ASS
 1983 – Maria Kardum, Kristianstads SLS
 1984 – Maria Kardum, Kristianstads SLS
 1985 – Anna-Karin Eriksson, Kalix SS
 1986 – Helena Kälvehed, SK Korrugal
 1987 – Anette Philipsson, Linköpings ASS
 1988 – Anette Philipsson, Linköpings ASS
 1989 – Helena Kälvehed, SK Korrugal
 1990 – Malin Gustafssson, Kristianstads SLS
 1991 – Malin Gustafssson, Helsingborgs SS
 1992 – Magdalena Schultz, Malmö KK
 1993 – Ulrika Jardfeldt, Turebergs IF
 1994 – Ulrika Jardfeldt, Turebergs IF
 1995 – Louise Karlsson, Skärets SS
 1996 – Louise Karlsson, Skärets SS
 1997 – Malin Svahnström, Väsby SS
 1998 – Sara Nordenstam, Skärets SS
 1999 – Malin Svahnström, Väsby SS
 2000 – Sara Nordenstam, Väsby SS
 2001 – Sara Nordenstam, Väsby SS
 2002 – Emma Igelström, Spårvägens SF
 2003 – Sara Nordenstam, Väsby SS
 2004 – Josefin Lillhage, Väsby SS
 2005 – Josefin Lillhage, Väsby SS
 2006 – Josefin Lillhage, Väsby SS
 2007 – Sara Thydén, Kalmar SS

400 m individual medley

 1962 – Elisabet Ljunggren, SK Neptun
 1963 – Elisabet Ljunggren, SK Neptun
 1964 – Elisabet Ljunggren, SK Neptun
 1965 – Elisabet Ljunggren, SK Neptun
 1966 – Elisabet Ljunggren, SK Neptun
 1967 – Ingrid Gustavsson, Luleå SS
 1968 – Ingrid Gustavsson, Luleå SS
 1969 – Gunilla Wikman, Stockholmspolisens IF
 1970 – Anita Zarnowiecki, Simavdelningen 1902
 1971 – Anita Zarnowiecki, Simavdelningen 1902
 1972 – Anita Zarnowiecki, Simavdelningen 1902
 1973 – Anita Zarnowiecki, Simavdelningen 1902
 1974 – Anita Zarnowiecki, Simavdelningen 1902
 1975 – Anita Zarnowiecki, Simavdelningen 1902
 1976 – Carolina Eriksson, Södertälje SS
 1977 – Ann-Sofi Roos, Kristianstads SLS
 1978 – Ann-Sofi Roos, Kristianstads SLS
 1979 – Ann-Sofi Roos, Kristianstads SLS
 1980 – Ann-Sofi Roos, Kristianstads SLS
 1981 – Sofia Kraft, Götene SS
 1982 – Anette Philipsson, Linköpings ASS
 1983 – Sofia Kraft, Götene SS
 1984 – Sofia Kraft, Götene SS
 1985 – Sofia Kraft, SK Ran
 1986 – Anette Philipsson, Linköpings ASS
 1987 – Sofia Kraft, SK Ran
 1988 – Anette Philipsson, Linköpings ASS
 1989 – Anna-Lena Nilsson, Malmö KK
 1990 – Veronika Svensson, Ystads SS
 1991 – Andrea Bolin, Jönköpings SS
 1992 – Magdalena Schultz, Malmö KK
 1993 – Magdalena Schultz, Malmö KK
 1994 – Ann-Sofie Jönnson, Tunafors SK
 1995 – Magdalena Schultz, Södertälje SS
 1996 – Malin Svahnström, Väsby SS
 1997 – Josefin Lindgren, Ystads SS
 1998 – Sara Nordenstam, Skärets SS
 1999 – Sara Nordenstam, Skärets SS
 2000 – Sara Nordenstam, Väsby SS
 2001 – Sara Nordenstam, Väsby SS
 2002 – Sara Nordenstam, Väsby SS
 2003 – Sara Nordenstam, Väsby SS
 2004 – Ann Berglund, Jönköpings SS
 2005 – Sara Thydén, Kalmar SS
 2006 – Sara Thydén, Kalmar SS
 2007 – Eva Berglund, Jönköpings SS

4×100 m freestyle relay

 1934 – Malmö SS
 1935 – Stockholms KK
 1936 – Stockholms KK
 1937 – Jönköpings SLS
 1938 – Stockholms KK
 1939 – Stockholms KK
 1940 – Stockholms KK
 1941 – IFK Stockholm
 1942 – IFK Stockholm
 1943 – IFK Stockholm
 1944 – IFK Stockholm
 1945 – Stockholms KK
 1946 – IFK Stockholm
 1947 – Stockholms KK
 1948 – Stockholms KK
 1949 – IFK Stockholm
 1950 – Karlskoga SS
 1951 – SK Elfsborg
 1952 – SK Neptun
 1953 – SK Neptun
 1954 – SK Neptun
 1955 – SK Neptun
 1956 – SK Neptun
 1957 – SK Ran
 1958 – SK Ran (Barbro Andersson, Nin Persson, Karin Larsson, Kristina Larsson)
 1959 – SK Ran (Nin Persson, Barbro Andersson, Karin Larsson, Kristina Larsson)
 1960 – SK Neptun (Birgitta Friberg, Jane Cederqvist, Karin Stenbäck, Bibbi Segerström)
 1961 – SK Neptun (Margareta Rylander, Jane Cederqvist, Karin Stenbäck, Bibbi Segerström)
 1962 – SK Neptun
 1963 – SK Neptun
 1964 – SK Neptun
 1965 – SK Neptun
 1966 – SK Neptun
 1967 – Västerås SS
 1968 – Timrå AIF
 1969 – Stockholmspolisens IF
 1970 – Stockholmspolisens IF
 1971 – Gävle SS
 1972 – Stockholmspolisens IF
 1973 – Simavdelningen 1902
 1974 – Stockholmspolisens IF
 1975 – Kristianstads SLS
 1976 – Kristianstads SLS
 1977 – Stockholmspolisens IF
 1978 – Västerås SS
 1979 – Kristianstads SLS
 1980 – Kristianstads SLS
 1981 – Stockholmspolisens IF
 1982 – Stockholmspolisens IF
 1983 – Stockholmspolisens IF
 1984 – Kristianstads SLS
 1985 – Kristianstads SLS
 1986 – Kristianstads SLS
 1987 – Kristianstads SLS
 1988 – Kristianstads SLS
 1989 – Helsingborgs SS
 1990 – Malmö KK
 1991 – Järfälla SS
 1992 – Malmö KK
 1993 – Malmö KK
 1994 – Spårvägens SF
 1995 – Helsingborgs SS
 1996 – Helsingborgs SS
 1997 – Helsingborgs SS
 1998 – Göteborg Sim (Claire Hedenskog, Malin Nilsson, Anna Ericsson, Josefin Lillhage)
 1999 – Malmö KK (Lisa Wänberg, Lotta Wänberg, Jenny Redlund, Camilla Helgesson)
 2000 – SK Neptun (Julia Russell, Jessica Lidström, Therese Alshammar, Destiny Laurén)
 2001 – Väsby SS
 2002 – Väsby SS (Malin Svahnström, Josefin Lillhage, Gabriella Fagundez, Denise Helgesson)
 2003 – Väsby SS (Denise Helgesson, Josefin Lillhage, Gabriella Fagundez, Malin Svahnström)
 2004 – Väsby SS (Gabriella Fagundez, Malin Svahnström, Therese Mattsson, Josefin Lillhage)
 2005 – Väsby SS (Gabriella Fagundez, Josefin Lillhage, Malin Svahnström, Therese Mattsson)
 2006 – Väsby SS (Gabriella Fagundez, Josefin Lillhage, Malin Svahnström, Therese Mattsson)
 2007 – Väsby SS (Ida Sandin, Josefin Lillhage, Petra Granlund, Malin Svahnström)

4×200 m freestyle relay

 1980 – Kristianstads SLS
 1981 – Västerås SS
 1982 – Stockholmspolisens IF
 1983 – Stockholmspolisens IF
 1984 – Stockholmspolisens IF
 1985 – Kristianstads SLS
 1986 – Kristianstads SLS
 1987 – Mariestads SS
 1988 – Kristianstads SLS
 1989 – Malmö KK
 1990 – Malmö KK
 1991 – Malmö KK
 1992 – Malmö KK
 1993 – Malmö KK
 1994 – Malmö KK
 1995 – Malmö KK
 1996 – Malmö KK
 1997 – Simavdelningen 1902
 1998 – Malmö KK (Lotta Wänberg, Lisa Wänberg, Jenny Redlund, Camilla Helgesson)
 1999 – Malmö KK (Lotta Wänberg, Jenny Redlund, Helen Svensson, Camilla Helgesson)
 2000 – Malmö KK (Lotta Wänberg, Jenny Redlund, Lisa Wänberg, Camilla Helgesson)
 2001 – Malmö KK
 2002 – Väsby SS (Malin Svahnström, Josefin Lillhage, Sara Nordenstam, Denise Helgesson)
 2003 – Väsby SS (Malin Svahnström, Josefin Lillhage, Denise Helgesson, Gabriella Fagundez)
 2004 – Väsby SS (Malin Svahnström, Denise Helgesson, Gabriella Fagundez, Josefin Lillhage)
 2005 – Väsby SS (Gabriella Fagundez, Therese Matsson, Josefin Lillhage, Malin Svahnström)
 2006 – Väsby SS (Gabriella Fagundez, Josefin Lillhage, Malin Svahnström, Ida Sandin)
 2007 – Väsby SS (Petra Granlund, Malin Svahnström, Josefin Lillhage, Ida Sandin)

4×100 m medley relay

 1949 – SK Neptun
 1950 – SK Neptun
 1951 – SK Neptun
 1952 – SK Neptun
 1953 – SK Neptun
 1954 – SK Neptun
 1955 – SK Neptun
 1956 – SK Neptun
 1957 – SK Neptun
 1958 – SK Neptun (Monica Öberg, Berit Piper, Birgitta Lundqvist, Bibbi Segerström)
 1959 – SK Neptun (Monica Öberg, Margareta Winquist, Birgitta Lundqvist, Bibbi Segerström)
 1960 – SK Ran (Nin Persson, Kristina Larsson, Karin Larsson, Barbro Andersson)
 1961 – SK Neptun (Bibbi Segerström, Marianne Johansson, Karin Stenbäck, Jane Cederqvist)
 1962 – SK Neptun
 1963 – SK Neptun
 1964 – SK Neptun
 1965 – Upsala SS
 1966 – SK Neptun
 1967 – Upsala SS
 1968 – Stockholmspolisens IF
 1969 – Stockholmspolisens IF
 1970 – Stockholmspolisens IF
 1971 – Stockholmspolisens IF
 1972 – Stockholmspolisens IF
 1973 – Stockholmspolisens IF
 1974 – Göteborgs KK Najaden
 1975 – Göteborgs KK Najaden
 1976 – Simavdelningen 1902
 1977 – Simavdelningen 1902
 1978 – Stockholmspolisens IF
 1979 – Kristianstads SLS
 1980 – Kristianstads SLS
 1981 – Kristianstads SLS
 1982 – Stockholmspolisens IF
 1983 – Stockholmspolisens IF
 1984 – Kristianstads SLS
 1985 – Stockholmspolisens IF
 1986 – Kristianstads SLS
 1987 – Kristianstads SLS
 1988 – Malmö KK
 1989 – Kristianstads SLS
 1990 – Kristianstads SLS
 1991 – Helsingborgs SS
 1992 – Malmö KK
 1993 – Södertälje SS (Jetta Holm, Charlotte Humling, Anna-Karin Rantzow, Susanne Lööw)
 1994 – Spårvägens SF
 1995 – Växjö SS
 1996 – Helsingborgs SS
 1997 – Växjö SS
 1998 – Växjö SS (Camilla Johansson, Hanna Jaltner, Emma Petersson, Kajsa Karlsson)
 1999 – Trelleborgs SS (Camilla Johansson, Hanna Jaltner, Emma Pålsson, Sandra Steffensen)
 2000 – SK Neptun (Therese Alshammar, Julia Russel, Destiny Laurén, Jessica Lidström)
 2001 – Väsby SS
 2002 – Väsby SS (Malin Svahnström, Sara Nordenstam, Gabriella Fagundez, Josefin Lillhage)
 2003 – Södertörns SS (Susannah Moonan, Maria Östling, Cathrin Carlzon, Louise Jöhncke)
 2004 – Södertörns SS (Susannah Moonan, Maria Östling, Cathrin Carlzon, Cecilia Sjöholm)
 2005 – Spårvägens SF (Natasha Sundin, Ida Nilsson, Johanna Sjöberg, Stina Gardell)
 2006 – Spårvägens SF (Anna Ahlin, Ida Nilsson, Sofie Gardell, Johanna Sjöberg)
 2007 – Göteborg Sim (Elin Harnebrandt, Joline Höglund, Isabelle Höglund, Claire Hedenskog)

Discontinued events

400 m breaststroke

 1942 – Inga-Lill Hermansson, Stockholms KK
 1943 – Maj-Britt Jansson, Limhamns SS
 1944 – Kerstin Cassel, IFK Mora
 1945 – Marianne Fernlund, Stockholms KK
 1946 – Marianne Fernlund, Stockholms KK
 1947 – Marianne Fernlund, Stockholms KK
 1966 – Yvonne Brage, Skövde SS

4×50 m freestyle

 1993 – Norrköpings KK
 1994 – Helsingborgs SS
 1995 – Helsingborgs SS
 1996 – Helsingborgs SS

3×100 m medley

 1945 – IFK Stockholm
 1946 – Stockholms KK
 1947 – Stockholms KK
 1948 – IFK Stockholm

4×50 m medley

 1994 – Helsingborgs SS
 1995 – Helsingborgs SS
 1996 – Helsingborgs SS

Life saving

 1921 – Jane Gylling, SK Najaden
 1922 – Jane Gylling, SK Najaden
 1923 – Hjördis Töpel, SK Najaden
 1924 – Hjördis Töpel, SK Najaden
 1925 – Valborg Pettersson, Eskilstuna SS
 1926 – Eva Olliwier, Stockholms KK
 1927 – May Eliasson, IFK Stockholm
 1928 – May Eliasson, IFK Stockholm
 1929 – May Eliasson, IFK Stockholm
 1930 – Ingrid Dott, Norrköpings KK
 1931 – Ingrid Dott, Norrköpings KK
 1932 – Ingrid Dott, Norrköpings KK
 1933 – Ingrid Dott, Norrköpings KK
 1934 – Ingrid Sjöstam, Örebro SS
 1935 – Kerstin Eriksson, Stockholms KK
 1936 – Marianne Berglund, Stockholms KK
 1937 – Marianne Berglund, Stockholms KK
 1938 – Marianne Berglund, Stockholms KK
 1939 – Gunnel Söderberg, IFK Stockholm
 1940 – Ingrid Wallin, IFK Stockholm
 1941 – Gunnel Söderberg, IFK Stockholm
 1942 – Gunnel Söderberg, IFK Stockholm
 1943 – Vera Dahlberg, IF Elfsborg
 1944 – Gunvor Nilsson, Hälsingborgs SS
 1945 – Marianne Nilsson, Malmö S
 1946 – Marianne Nilsson, Malmö S
 1947 – Elisabeth Ahlgren, Linköpings ASS
 1948 – Elisabeth Ahlgren, Linköpings ASS
 1949 – Elisabeth Ahlgren, Linköpings ASS
 1950 – Marianne Fernlund, Stockholms KK
 1951 – Gunnel Ekström, Harnäs SS
 1952 – Gunnel Ekström, Harnäs SS
 1954 – Ruth Wester, SK Neptun
 1954 – Monica Peters, Limhamns SS
 1955 – Monica Peters, Limhamns SS
 1956 – Monica Peters, Limhamns SS
 1957 – Berit Piper, SK Neptun
 1958 – Anne-Christine Hessler, IK Attack
 1959 – Inger Thorngren, Upsala S
 1960 – Inger Thorngren, Upsala S
 1961 – Inger Thorngren, Upsala S
 1962 – Ulla Brännström, Bodens BK
 1963 – Inger Thorngren, Upsala S
 1964 – Inger Thorngren, Upsala S
 1965 – Marianne Lundqvist, Gävle SS
 1966 – Agneta Thunell, Bromma SS
 1967 – Eva Schiller, Eskilstuna SS
 1968 – Katarina Ladersted, Göteborgs KK

References
 Alm, B. (2004). Historiska simtag: Svensk simidrott under hundra år, Solna: Svenska Simförbundet

Swimming competitions in Sweden
Swimming Championships champions